Samanabad (Punjabi) is neighborhood located in Samanabad Tehsil of Lahore, Punjab, Pakistan.

Educational institutions
Samanabad is an important hub of educational activities. Many colleges and schools belonging to the government sector, as well as private sector, academies and tuition centers, are serving the cause of education at this hub of knowledge. Important educational institutes of the government and private sector housed at Samanabad include:
 Government College for Women
 Government Central Model High School
 Government Islamia High School
 Government Girls Higher Secondary School
 Government Institute of Commerce
 Government Sulemania High School
 Government Junior Model School
 KIPS
 Lahore Grammar School
 The Educators
 'The Lahore Lyceum'
 American Lycetuff School System
 The Times College
 New Era Grammar School
 Central Group Of Colleges
 Hassan Memorial Science Academy
 Laraib National Academy
 Naveeed Majeed Academy
 Gracious Home Grammar School
 The Aquila School System
 U C Mas Education Group
 Unique High School and Unique Science Academy
 Fame Institute of Commerce and Science
 New World Academy
Dar-E-Raza Islamic School & Academy

Sports
Several Sports facilities are provided to the residents in Samanabad. The most common sport played in Samanabad is cricket and football. "Samanabad Sports Arena" has been established which provides facilities such as Badminton, Gym, Squash, Table Tennis, Taekwando, Aerobics and Snooker to the members. There are playgrounds at different locations in Samanabad, where several tournaments of football and cricket are held.

Sites of interest and importance

The three most important main roads of Samanabad in terms of commercial activity include:

1. Main Boulevard Samanabad: 
 Jamia Masjid Aqs E Jamil 
 Automobile Market
 Rasheedia Masjid 
 Main Market of Samanabad 
 Bilal Masjid 
 Sheikhoo Restaurant (one of the most famous and oldest restaurant in the region) 
 Sheer e Rabbani Masjid 
 KIMS Restaurant
 Tomb of Zeb-un-Nisa 
 Bank branches of Habib Bank, Allied Bank, Bank Alfalah, Standard Chartered
 Cuisine specialities: Shawarma, Pathooray and Dahi Bhalle.
 Butt Sweets, Gourmet Bakery, Cakes and Bakes, Shezan Bakery, Bundu Khan Sweets
 Rizvi Market (Commonly Known as Old Video Market )

2. Poonch Road: 
 Haree Kothees (meaning homes with green painted façades)
 Masjid Umer E Farooq (in front road of Haree Kotheean you will see it almost in end of that road)
 Regional Office of NADRA (National Database and Registration Authority)
 Event and Marriage Halls
 Bank branches of Habib Metropolitan Bank, Summit Bank, National Bank of Pakistan, Bank of Punjab, Meezan Bank, Bank AL Habib, United Bank
 U C MAS.

3. Ghazali Road: 
 Khizra Masjid
 Independent Health Club
 Ghousia Masjid (Near Doosra Gol Chakkar)
 Student Photo Copy & Stationers
 Union Council Office (UC-106)
 Bohr Wala Chowk (one of the oldest surviving trees of Lahore)
 Samanabad Sports Arena 
 Doongi Ground
 Samanabad Post Office
 Amy's Bakers

Samanabad is also known for its roundabouts:
 1st Roundabout (Pehla Gol Chakkar), seen while coming from Mor Samnabad, it is junction from Mor Samanabad and coming from Chuburji on Poonch Road
 2nd Roundabout (Doosra Gol Chakkar), near Telephone Exchange & Mozang Meat Market
 3rd Roundabout (Teesra Gol Chakkar), near Samanabad Girls College & Niazi Hospital

There are two important shopping centres in Samanabad namely Main Market (between first and second roundabout) and the Mini Market near Central Model School, Zainab Masjid, Qayyum Park, Samanabad.
Pakki Thatti Chowk
Almumtaz Cinema the oldest cinema in the area
Hafiz wali Masjid,
Ghusia Masjid,
'Tahir Bakery', the most famous store in the area of Samanabad Lahore,
Rasheed Bakery the oldest bakery in the area,
Kazim General Store,
Pak Store,
Rehman Store,
Attique General Store (Has been ended after the death of parents of Mr. Attique),
Al-Buraq General Store.

There are markets in Samanabad including Main Market, Mini Market (Choti Market), Chiragh Market (Pakki Thatti Market).
The first two have been already discussed while Chiragh Market is a market place having shops of clothes, jewelry, household products, sweets, wedding related products, beuaty saloons etc.
Pakki Thatti is also famous as "Pakki Thatti Bus Stop" because this chowk was used to be the stoping point of buses going towards bhatti and railway station.
Bastami Road is also one of the most important, old and famous roads in Samanabad. It has some old mosques including Jamia Masjid bustamia hunfia, jamia masjid Baba Laal Shah and Aik Minar wali Masjid. The most famous point of Bastami Road is Mithai wala chowk. It has almost all kind of shops including from breakfast to sweets as well as household products too.

References

Samanabad Zone